Edward Stourton, 6th Baron Stourton (1463–1535) was a younger son of William, the second Baron Stourton and Margaret Chidiock, daughter of Sir John Chidiock, sometimes called Lord FitzPayne.

He succeeded his elder brother William in 1523. The sixth Baron was a justice of the peace, entrusted with the task of collecting £163,000 by poll-tax.

He reached a considerable age, but was described by his son William as being "feeble and infirm" in his last years; William asked that his father be excused attendance at the House of Lords in view of his age and infirmity.

He married Agnes Fauntleroy, daughter of John Fauntleroy of Dorset, and had three sons. He was succeeded by his son William in 1535.

References
 Kidd, Charles and David Williamson (editors). Debrett's Peerage and Baronetage (1995 edition). London: St. Martin's Press, 1995.

1535 deaths
06
1463 births
15th-century English people
16th-century English nobility